Khezr-e Tireh (also Romanized as Kheẕr-e Tīreh) is a village in Kalej Rural District, in the Central District of Nowshahr County, Mazandaran Province, Iran. At the 2006 census, its population was 832, in 218 families.

References 

Populated places in Nowshahr County